In November 1918, communists in Luxembourg city revolted and started a short rebellion, inspired by similar events in Germany. The rebellion soon spread to Esch-sur-Alzette. It was quickly suppressed by the Grand Ducal Gendarmerie, and was followed by the larger republican Luxembourg Rebellion the following January.

November 10th 

On November 10, 1918, people in Luxembourg City attempted to join Rosa Luxemburg in a communist revolution. They rebel against the government of Luxembourg, This failed as the police was called in and ended the revolt.

November 11th 
One day after the failed Revolution in Luxembourg city, people rebelled again in Esch-sur-Alzette This also failed as police forces engaged.

Government response 
Socialists in the government soon called for the abdication of Grand Duchess Marie Adelaide, which was only narrowly defeated by 21 votes to 19. In late December the Luxembourg prime minister asked for help for future events. Talks failed and the socialists in the government soon called for the abdication of Grand Duchess Marie Adelaide again, this failed and soon the socialists called for the people, this began the Luxembourg Rebellion which led to the abdication of Grand Duchess Marie Adelaide.

References

External links
Mutiny in the Grand Duchy
Why Does Luxembourg Exist? (Short Animated Documentary)
The history of Luxembourg and its dynasties

Coup d'état attempts in Europe
Communist revolutions
History of Luxembourg (1890–1945)
Revolutions of 1917–1923